Austin Building may refer to:

Building 800-Austin Hall, Montgomery, Alabama, listed on the NRHP in Alabama
Austin Building (Denver, Colorado), listed on the National Register of Historic Places listings in Northeast Denver, Colorado
Glidden-Austin Block, Newcastle, Maine, listed on the National Register of Historic Places listings in Lincoln County, Maine
Austin City Hall, Austin, Nevada, listed on the National Register of Historic Places in Nevada
Austin Masonic and Odd Fellows Hall, Austin, Nevada, listed on the National Register of Historic Places in Nevada
Austin, Nichols and Company Warehouse, Brooklyn, New York, listed on the National Register of Historic Places in Kings County, New York
Austin County Jail, Bellville, Texas, listed on the National Register of Historic Places in Austin County, Texas
Austin Daily Tribune Building, Austin, Texas, listed on the National Register of Historic Places in Travis County, Texas

See also
Austin Hall (disambiguation)
Austin House (disambiguation)
Austin Historic District (disambiguation)